Salomon Mayer von Rothschild (9 September 1774 – 28 July 1855) was a German-born banker in the Austrian Empire and the founder of the Austrian branch of the prominent Mayer Amschel Rothschild family.

Family
He was born at Frankfurt am Main the third child and second son of Mayer Amschel Rothschild (1744–1812) and Gutlé Schnapper (1753–1849). In 1800, he married Caroline Stern (1782–1854). They had the following children:
 Anselm Salomon (1803–1874) - married his cousin Charlotte Nathan Rothschild in 1826.
 Betty von Rothschild (1805–1886) - married her uncle James Mayer de Rothschild in 1824.

His father had built a hugely prosperous banking business in Germany. Wanting to expand the family business across Europe, the eldest Rothschild son remained in Frankfurt, while each of the other four sons were sent to different European cities to establish a banking branch. Salomon von Rothschild was made a shareholder of the de Rothschild Frères bank when it was opened in Paris in 1817 by brother James Mayer de Rothschild.

Endogamy was an essential part of the Rothschild family's strategy for future success in order to ensure that control of their businesses remained in family hands. Therefore, in 1824 Salomon Mayer Rothschild's daughter Betty married her uncle James Mayer de Rothschild, head of the Paris bank.

Career
Trained in finance and with years of experience, Salomon Rothschild was sent in 1820 to Austria to formalize the family's existing involvements in financing Austrian  government projects. In the same year, 1820, he established S M von Rothschild in Vienna. The business financed the Nordbahn rail transport network, Austria's first steam railway, plus funding various government undertakings where large amounts of capital had to be raised. He made connections amongst the country's aristocracy and its political elite through Prince Klemens Metternich and Friedrich von Gentz. 

Under the direction of Salomon von Rothschild, the Viennese bank was highly successful, playing an integral role in the development of the Austrian economy. In recognition of his services, in 1816 Salomon Mayer Rothschild had been raised to the Austrian nobility by Emperor Francis I, the patent being offered to all five brothers, though declined by Nathan Meyer Rothschild. 

In 1822, Salomon von Rothschild, along with his brothers again, was further honoured when the Emperor awarded him the hereditary title "Freiherr" (Baron). 

In 1843, Salomon, Freiherr von Rothschild became the first Jew to ever be given honorary Austrian citizenship.

Salomon von Rothschild's personal wealth was enormous and he acquired extensive properties and made investments in art and antiquities. Despite the fact that he made substantial contributions to philanthropic causes, the concentration of vast wealth by the few members of the Austrian elite resulted in a growing civil unrest in the country.

By the time of the revolutions of 1848 in the Habsburg areas, anti-Rothschild sentiments were frequently being voiced and written about in broadsheets such as Ein offener Brief an Rothschild. With the fall of  Metternich,  Salomon von Rothschild lost some of his political clout and his bank a considerable amount of money.

Under pressure, the 74-year-old handed over the reins of the bank to his son Anselm but it was not without rancor. He left Vienna and retired in Paris where he died in 1855. From his collection some of the objets d'art from the Italian and French Renaissance together with 18th-century works were donated to the Louvre including two paintings by Carlo Dolci.

See also
 Rothschild banking family of England
 Rothschild banking family of France
 Rothschild banking family of Naples

References

Sources
 The Rothschilds; a Family Portrait by Frederic Morton. Atheneum Publishers (1962)  (1998 reprint)
 The Rothschilds, a Family of Fortune by Virginia Cowles. Alfred A. Knopf (1973)  
 Rothschild: The Wealth and Power of a Dynasty by Derek Wilson. Scribner, London (1988) 
 House of Rothschild : Money's Prophets: 1798-1848 by Niall Ferguson. Viking Press (1998) 
 The House of Rothschild (vol 2): The World's Banker: 1849-1999 by Niall Ferguson. Viking Press (1999)

External links

 International cente in London for research into the history of the Rothschild family, rothschildarchive.org; accessed 15 June 2017.
 Objets d'Art donated to the Louvre, insecula.com; accessed 15 June 2017.

1774 births
1855 deaths
18th-century German businesspeople
18th-century Austrian businesspeople
19th-century Austrian businesspeople
Austrian art collectors
Austrian bankers
Austrian expatriates in France
Philanthropists from Vienna
Salomon Mayer
Businesspeople from Vienna
German emigrants to the Austrian Empire
Stern family (banking)